The following is a complete chronology of various line-ups of Oingo Boingo and The Mystic Knights of the Oingo Boingo, from 1972 until 1995.

Former members

Additional musicians

Timeline
While most members played a variety of instruments and vocals, this timeline represents a member's service listed under their main instrument.

References 

Oingo Boingo